Kate Kellaway (born 15 July 1957) is an English journalist and literary critic who writes for The Observer.

Early life
The daughter of the Australians Bill and Deborah Kellaway, she is the older sister of the journalist Lucy Kellaway. Both siblings were educated at the Camden School for Girls, where their mother was a teacher, and at Lady Margaret Hall, Oxford, where she read English.

Professional life
Following a period teaching in Zimbabwe between 1982 and 1986, she began her career in journalism at the Literary Review and became deputy to then editor Auberon Waugh around 1987.

Kellaway later joined The Observer, where her posts have included features writer, deputy literary editor, deputy theatre critic and children's books editor. While The Observers poetry editor, Kellaway was one of the five judges for the Booker Prize in 1995.

Kellaway is married and has four sons and two step-sons.

References

External links
 Kellaway's portfolio in The Guardian
 Kellaway's portfolio in New Statesman
 Kellaway's portfolio in Prospect magazine

1957 births
Living people
Alumni of Lady Margaret Hall, Oxford
British journalists
People educated at Camden School for Girls